Syed Aamer Ali (born 24 November 1978), known as Amir Ali, is a Pakistani-born cricketer who plays for the Oman national cricket team. He made his debut for the Omani national side in 2007.

Early days
Aamer was born in Karachi, Pakistan, and played briefly in Pakistani domestic competitions before emigrating to Oman, making appearances at first-class level for the Karachi Whites and the Karachi Blues. His debut for Oman came at the 2007 ACC Twenty20 Cup, hosted by Kuwait, and later in the year he played in the 2007 World Cricket League Division Two tournament in Namibia, where matches held list-A status. At the tournament, his best figures were 4/63 against the United Arab Emirates.

International career
Aamer has since been a regular for Oman in international tournaments, playing further list-A matches at the 2009 World Cup Qualifier and Twenty20 matches at the 2012 and 2015 World Twenty20 Qualifiers. He made Twenty20 International debut for Oman in the fifth-place playoff at the 2015 World Twenty20 Qualifier, against Afghanistan.

Aamer was included in to the Oman squad for 2016 ICC World Twenty20. In the first match against Ireland, he scored match winning 32 runs from 17 balls. This included 5 fours and a six, and Oman won the match by 2 wickets.

References

External links
 

1978 births
Living people
Karachi Whites cricketers
Karachi Blues cricketers
Omani cricketers
Oman Twenty20 International cricketers
Pakistani cricketers
Pakistani emigrants to Oman
Pakistani expatriates in Oman
Cricketers from Karachi